"Eddie" is a song by American rock band Red Hot Chili Peppers from the band's thirteenth studio album Return of the Dream Canteen. The song was released as a promotional single on September 23, 2022. No music video was created for the song, but it did receive moderate airplay.

Background
"Eddie" was written as a tribute to guitarist Eddie Van Halen, who died in 2020. It was first conceived by Flea the day after his passing, after which the rest of the band contributed to the track.

Live performances
"Eddie" was performed for the first time on October 9, 2022 at the Austin City Limits Music Festival. It was the first song from Return of the Dream Canteen to be performed live.

Personnel
Red Hot Chili Peppers
Anthony Kiedis – lead vocals
Flea – bass
John Frusciante – guitar
Chad Smith – drums

Additional personnel
Rick Rubin – production
Ryan Hewitt – engineering

Charts

References

2021 songs
2022 singles
Red Hot Chili Peppers songs
Songs about musicians
Commemoration songs
Van Halen
Songs written by Anthony Kiedis
Songs written by Flea (musician)
Songs written by John Frusciante
Songs written by Chad Smith